The SantosLab Carcará is a Brazilian light weight unmanned aerial vehicle designed to be transported by a single soldier. The soldier's height allows takeoff and landing in restricted areas where other aircraft are unable to operate. It is designed to be used in any theater even if it is without roads or paths, or surrounded by obstacles.

It is designed to be used by Brazilian Marine Corps infantry in real-time reconnaissance.

Characteristics

The Carcará was ordered by the Brazilian Navy to equip an infantry Marine Corps. The Navy wanted a UAV with stealth features which was lightweight, flexible and resistant. The Carcará has a low acoustic signature, can be controlled by a single soldier and can gather telemetry data. It can be programmed to follow a target automatically. To the naked eye while in the air, it is very similar to a caracara.

Specifications
Wingspan: 160 cm
Operating speed: 40 km / h
Takeoff: manual or catapult
Recovery: "deep stall"
Autonomy: 60 to 95 minutes
Payload: mobile camera with zoom, or Infra-red sensor

External links
 https://web.archive.org/web/20091202073024/http://www.uav.com.br/carcara.htm
 http://www.defesanet.com.br/01_lz/laad2009/imagens/mb/carcara_vant.jpg

2000s Brazilian military aircraft
2000s Brazilian military reconnaissance aircraft
Unmanned military aircraft of Brazil